This is a complete list of songs from the Negima! anime and live action series. The voice actresses and the live action actresses of the girls in Negi's class sing all the songs in the anime and live action series respectively.

Character Songs
Many character CDs were released; on them was a greeting, original song, a karaoke version of that song, a remix, a short mini-drama and a free talk with the voice actors. One Character CD was released once a month.

Negima! Anime
For most episodes, the Negima anime uses one opening song that has multiple versions.

Each version is sung by a group of five or six of the girls, organized by seat number.

Negima!? Anime

Magister Negi Magi: Mahō Sensei Negima!!
Below is a list of songs from the Negima!! live action adaptation.

Negima! Shiroki Tsubasa Ala Alba OAD

Negima! Mou Hitotsu no Sekai Another World OAD

Mahou Sensei Negima! Anime Final

Negima
Negima